Mayor Pablo Lagerenza is a town in the Alto Paraguay department of Paraguay. It was once the capital of the former Chaco (Department) department, consisting today of the western part of Alto Paraguay.

Sources 
World Gazeteer: Paraguay – World-Gazetteer.com

Populated places in the Alto Paraguay Department